The Yèvre is a river of the Marne department in the Grand Est region of France. It has its source at Somme-Yèvre and flows through Dommartin-Varimont, Dampierre-le-Château, Rapsécourt, Voilemont and Dommartin-Dampierre.

References

Rivers of Marne (department)
Rivers of France
Rivers of Grand Est